The expression problem is a challenging problem in programming languages that concerns the extensibility and modularity of statically typed data abstractions. The goal is to define a data abstraction that is extensible both in its representations and its behaviors, where one can add new representations and new behaviors to the data abstraction, without recompiling existing code, and while retaining static type safety (e.g., no casts). It exposed deficiencies in programming paradigms and programming languages, and it is still not definitively solved, although there are many proposed solutions.

History 
Philip Wadler formulated the challenge and named it "The Expression Problem" in response to a discussion with Rice University's Programming Languages Team (PLT).
He also cited three sources that defined the context for his challenge:

The problem was first observed by John Reynolds in 1975. Reynolds discussed two forms of Data Abstraction: User-defined Types, which are now known as Abstract Data Types (ADTs) (not to be confused with Algebraic Data Types), and Procedural Data Structures, which are now understood as a primitive form of Objects with only one method. He argued that they are complementary, in that User-defined Types could be extended with new behaviors, and Procedural Data Structures could be extended with new representations. He also discussed related work going back to 1967. However, Reynold's conclusions based on this early analysis turned out to be completely wrong: he wrote that adding a second method to an object "is more a tour de force than a specimen of clear programming," which completely missed the Object-Oriented paradigm and its great success. He also believed the two forms of data abstraction "are inherently distinct and complementary."

Fifteen years later in 1990, William Cook 
applied Reynold's seminal idea in the context of Objects and Abstract Data Types, which had both grown extensively. Cook identified the matrix of representations and behaviors that are implicit in a Data Abstraction, and discussed how ADTs are based on the behavioral axis, while Objects are based on the representation axis. He provides extensive discussion of work on ADTs and Objects that are relevant to the problem. He also reviewed implementations in both styles, discussed extensibility in both directions, and also identified the importance of static typing.
Most importantly, he discussed situations in which there was more flexibility than
Reynolds considered, including internalization and optimization of methods.  

At ECOOP '98, Shriram Krishnamurthi et al. presented a design pattern solution to the problem of simultaneously extending an expression-oriented programming language and its tool-set.  They dubbed it the "expressivity problem" because they thought programming language designers could use the problem to demonstrate the expressive power of their creations. For PLT, the problem had shown up in the construction of DrScheme, now DrRacket, and they solved it via a rediscovery of mixins. To avoid using a programming language problem in a paper about programming languages, Krishnamurthi et al. used an old geometry programming problem to explain their pattern-oriented solution. In conversations with Felleisen and Krishnamurthi after the ECOOP presentation, Wadler understood the PL-centric nature of the problem and he pointed out that Krishnamurthi's solution used a cast to circumvent Java's type system. The discussion continued on the types mailing list, where Corky Cartwright (Rice) and Kim Bruce (Williams) showed how type systems for OO languages might eliminate this cast. In response Wadler formulated his essay and stated the challenge, "whether a language can solve the expression problem is a salient indicator of its capacity for expression." The label "expression problem" puns on expression = "how much can your language express" and expression = "the terms you are trying to represent are language expressions".

Others co-discovered variants of the expression problem around the same time as Rice University's PLT, in particular Thomas Kühne in his dissertation, and Smaragdakis and Batory in a parallel ECOOP 98 article.

Some follow-up work used the expression problem to showcase the power of programming language designs.

The expression problem is also a fundamental problem in multi-dimensional Software Product Line design and in particular as an application or special case of FOSD Program Cubes.

Solutions 
There are various solutions to the expression problem. Each solution varies in the amount of code a user must write to implement them, and the language features they require.

 Multiple dispatch
 Open classes
 Coproducts of functors
 Type classes
 Tagless-final / Object algebras
 Polymorphic Variants

Example

Problem description 
We can imagine we do not have the source code for the following library, written in C#, which we wish to extend:

public interface IEvalExp
{
    int Eval();
}

public class Lit: IEvalExp
{
    public Lit(int n)
    {
        N = n;
    }

    public int N { get; }

    public int Eval()
    {
        return N;
    }
}

public class Add: IEvalExp
{
    public Add(IEvalExp left, IEvalExp right)
    {
        Left = left;
        Right = right;
    }

    public IEvalExp Left { get; }

    public IEvalExp Right { get; }

    public int Eval()
    {
        return Left.Eval() + Right.Eval();
    }
}

public static class ExampleOne
{
    public static IEvalExp AddOneAndTwo() => new Add(new Lit(1), new Lit(2));
    public static int EvaluateTheSumOfOneAndTwo() => AddOneAndTwo().Eval();
}

Now imagine that we wish to extend this library, adding a new type is easy because we are working with an Object-oriented programming language. For example, we might create the following class:

public class Mult: IEvalExp
{
    public Mult(IEvalExp left, IEvalExp right)
    {
        Left = left;
        Right = right;
    }

    public IEvalExp Left { get; }

    public IEvalExp Right { get; }

    public int Eval()
    {
        return Left.Eval() * Right.Eval();
    }
}

However, if we wish to add a new function over the type (a new method in C# terminology) we have to change the  interface and then modify all the classes that implement the interface. The problem is reversed in functional programming languages like F# where it is easy to add a function over a given type, but extending or adding types is difficult.

Problem Solution using Object Algebra 
Let us redesign the original library with extensibility in mind using the ideas from the paper Extensibility for the Masses.

public interface ExpAlgebra<T>
{
    T Lit(int n);
    T Add(T left, T right);
}

public class ExpFactory: ExpAlgebra<IEvalExp>
{
    public IEvalExp Lit(int n)
    {
        return new Lit(n);
    }

    public IEvalExp Add(IEvalExp left, IEvalExp right)
    {
        return new Add(left, right);
    }
}

public static class ExampleTwo<T>
{
    public static T AddOneToTwo(ExpAlgebra<T> ae) => ae.Add(ae.Lit(1), ae.Lit(2));
}

We use the same implementation as in the first code example but now add a new interface containing the functions over the type as well as a factory for the algebra.  Notice that we now generate the expression in  using the  interface instead of directly from the types.  We can now add a function by extending the  interface, we will add functionality to print the expression:

public interface IPrintExp: IEvalExp
{
    string Print();
}

public class PrintableLit: Lit, IPrintExp
{
    public PrintableLit(int n): base(n)
    {
        N = n;
    }

    public int N { get; }

    public string Print()
    {
        return N.ToString();
    }
}

public class PrintableAdd: Add, IPrintExp
{
    public PrintableAdd(IPrintExp left, IPrintExp right): base(left, right)
    {
        Left = left;
        Right = right;
    }

    public new IPrintExp Left { get; }

    public new IPrintExp Right { get; }

    public string Print()
    {
        return Left.Print() + " + " + Right.Print();
    }
}

public class PrintFactory: ExpFactory, ExpAlgebra<IPrintExp>
{
    public IPrintExp Add(IPrintExp left, IPrintExp right)
    {
        return new PrintableAdd(left, right);
    }

    public new IPrintExp Lit(int n)
    {
        return new PrintableLit(n);
    }
}

public static class ExampleThree
{
    public static int Evaluate() => ExampleTwo<IPrintExp>.AddOneToTwo(new PrintFactory()).Eval();
    public static string Print() => ExampleTwo<IPrintExp>.AddOneToTwo(new PrintFactory()).Print();
}

Notice also that this is still strongly typed, we do not need reflection or casting.

See also 
 Applications of FOSD program cubes
 Generic programming
 POPLmark challenge

References

External links 
The Expression Problem by Philip Wadler.
Lecture: The Expression Problem by Ralf Lämmell.
C9 Lectures: Dr. Ralf Lämmel - Advanced Functional Programming - The Expression Problem at Channel 9.
Independently Extensible Solutions to the Expression Problem, Matthias Zenger and Martin Odersky, EPFL Lausanne.

Programming language design
Unsolved problems in computer science